Martin de Lisle Hart (born 17 November 1927) is an English former first-class cricketer.

Hart was born at Ealing. He later studied at St Edmund Hall at the University of Oxford. While studying at Oxford, he played first-class cricket for Oxford University in 1951, making four appearances against Gloucestershire, Middlesex, the Free Foresters and Leicestershire. Playing as a leg break bowler, he took 6 wickets at an average of 55.00 and with best figures of 2 for 77.

References

External links

1927 births
Living people
People from Ealing
Alumni of St Edmund Hall, Oxford
English cricketers
Oxford University cricketers